Imlah is a surname. Notable people with the surname include:

David Imlah, Australian curler and coach
John Imlah (1799–1846), Scottish poet
Mick Imlah (1956–2009), Scottish poet and editor

See also
Imla (biblical figure), the father of the Hebrew prophet Micaiah